François-Joseph-Philoclès Regnier de La Brière called Regnier  (1 April 1807, in Paris – 27 April 1885, in Paris) was a 19th-century French actor and playwright. The comedian Alcide Tousez was his uncle.

Biographie 
After he studied by the Oratorians, he made his comedian debut at the Théâtre Montmartre in 1826 then toured the French provinces, particularly in Metz and Nantes. He was admitted at the Comédie-Française in 1831, became a sociétaire in 1835 then the dean in 1865 before retiring in 1871. In 1884, he also became a professor at the Paris Conservatory, where among his students were Réjane, Marguerite Durand, Jules-Théophile Boucher and Constant Coquelin.

Theatre

Career at the Comédie-Française 
 Admission in 1831 
 Appointed 255th sociétaire in 1835; became dean in 1865
 Retirement in 1871

Anecdote 
In a letter from 1876 Regnier says that the unusual first name of Philoclès comes from the French translation of Agathocle by Christoph Martin Wieland whose his godfather was a great admirer. The name of Charles was substituted at his baptism, but the destruction of civil registers during the Paris Commune allowed him to recover it at the time of the reconstitution of his birth certificate.

References

Bibliography 
 Georges d'Heylli, Regnier, sociétaire de la Comédie-Française, Librairie générale, 1872.
 Henry Lyonnet, Dictionnaire des comédiens français, Revue universelle internationale illustrée, Genève, 1912.
 Gustave Vapereau, Dictionnaire universel des contemporains, Paris, 1865.

External links 
 Regnier, sociétaire de la Comédie-Française on Gallica
 Base documentaire La Grange on the site of the Comédie-Française

19th-century French male actors
French male stage actors
Sociétaires of the Comédie-Française
Male actors from Paris
1807 births
1885 deaths